The Powers Highway-Battle Creek Bridge is a bridge that formerly carried Powers Highway over Battle Creek in Brookfield Township, Michigan. It was listed on the National Register of Historic Places in 2000. The bridge is a double-intersection Warren truss, a design noted for its extremely lightweight members and low cost. It is the only known example of its type in Michigan.

History
The exact history of this bridge is unknown; however, the Michigan Department of Transportation lists a construction date of 1910. The bridge was likely constructed by the township as an inexpensive option.

The bridge is closed to traffic.

Description
The Powers Highway Bridge is a rigid-connected lattice pony truss bridge. It has a  25-foot span and a 15.8 foot-wide roadway on a 16.3-foot wide deck. The deck is constructed of a single layer of wood deck over six steel I-beam stringers and two outside channels. The bridge sits on a masonry abutment substructure.

References

External links
 Image gallery from HistoricBridges.org
 Information from BridgeHunter

National Register of Historic Places in Eaton County, Michigan
Bridges completed in 1910
Bridges in Michigan